Bridget Burgess (born December 26, 2001) is an Australian stock car racing driver. She competes full-time in the ARCA Menards Series West, driving the No. 88 Chevrolet for her family-owned team, BMI Racing.

Born in Australia, Burgess and her family moved to the United States in 2008. After beginning her racing career in short course off-road racing, she transitioned to competing on asphalt in 2019 to pursue a career in NASCAR.

Racing career
Burgess ran her first off road race at age 15. In 2017, she competed in the Open V8 class of the Lucas Oil Off Road Racing Series, scoring a podium finish in her debut race. She later competed in the series' Pro Lite class as well. Burgess began her stock car career in 2019 with a pair of races in the NASCAR K&N Pro Series West, where she finished 12th and 11th at Meridian Speedway and All American Speedway respectively.

At the 2020 ARCA Menards Series West series opener at the Las Vegas Bullring, Burgess' car suffered a gear failure, leaving her with a 17th-place finish. After skipping the series' doubleheader at her home track in Utah, Burgess' family team received a 2007 Toyota chassis on loan from Bill McAnally Racing. She drove the car in the remaining eight races of the season, leading to a streak of three consecutive top-ten finishes, including a career-best of seventh in her return to Las Vegas.

Burgess began the 2021 season with sponsorship from GearWrench tools and HMH Construction. In March, she made her ARCA Menards Series debut through a combination race with the West Series at Phoenix Raceway, where she finished 22nd. Her season-best was an eighth-place finish at Sonoma Raceway. Burgess ran as high as fifth in the race, which was her first in the series on a road course.

On March 8, 2022, Burgess announced that she would return full-time to the ARCA Menards Series West. Burgess tied her career-best finish at Portland International Raceway, finishing seventh. The next week, she followed up with another top-ten run by finishing tenth at Sonoma. At the Las Vegas Bullring, Burgess competed against her mother, Sarah Burgess, as the pair became the first mother and daughter to compete against each other in a NASCAR-sanctioned race. Bridget finished in 12th place ahead of Sarah in 17th.

Personal life
Originally from Brisbane, Queensland, Australia, Burgess' family moved to the United States in 2008 to pursue opportunities in motorsports. She currently lives in Tooele, Utah, near Utah Motorsports Campus. Her father, Adam, serves as her spotter. Her mother, Sarah, is a former off-road racing competitor and serves as Burgess' crew chief and owner. With a lack of funding compared to bigger teams in the series, Sarah is often tasked with completing the jobs of an entire pit crew, such as changing all four tires during a pit stop by herself.

Burgess frequently helps with mechanical work on her equipment; during the 2020 ARCA West season, she replaced the gear differential on her car between races on back-to-back days.

Motorsports career results

ARCA Menards Series
(key) (Bold – Pole position awarded by qualifying time. Italics – Pole position earned by points standings or practice time. * – Most laps led.)

ARCA Menards Series West

References

External links

 
 

Living people
2001 births
Racing drivers from Utah
Racing drivers from Brisbane
NASCAR drivers
ARCA Menards Series drivers
American female racing drivers
Australian female racing drivers
Off-road racing drivers
21st-century American women